The 1976–77 Essex Senior Football League season was the sixth in the history of Essex Senior Football League, a football competition in England.

League table

The league featured 14 clubs which competed in the league last season, along with three new clubs:
Chelmsford City reserves
Sawbridgeworth, joined from the Essex Olympian League, renaming themselves Sawbridgeworth Town
Woodford Town

League table

References

Essex Senior Football League seasons
1976–77 in English football leagues